Donovan Letts (born 10 January 1956) is a British film director, disc jockey (DJ) and musician. Letts first came to prominence as the videographer for the Clash, directing several of their music videos. In 1984, Letts co-founded the band Big Audio Dynamite with former Clash lead guitarist and co-lead vocalist Mick Jones, acting as the band's sampler and videographer before departing the band in 1990.

Letts has also directed music videos for Musical Youth, the Psychedelic Furs, Fun Boy Three, the Pretenders and Elvis Costello as well as the feature documentaries The Punk Rock Movie (1978) and The Clash: Westway to the World (2000).

Biography
Letts was born in London, and educated at Tenison's School in Kennington. In 1975, he ran the London clothing store Acme Attractions, selling "electric-blue zoot suits and jukeboxes, and pumping dub reggae all day long." He was deeply inspired by the music coming from his parents' homeland, Jamaica, in particular Bob Marley. After seeing one of Marley's gigs at the Hammersmith Odeon, in June 1976, Letts was able to sneak into the hotel and spent the night talking to and befriending Marley. By the mid-1970s Acme had quite a scene, attracting the likes of the Clash, Sex Pistols, Chrissie Hynde, Patti Smith, Debbie Harry and Bob Marley.

In a 2022 interview, Don Letts discussed growing up in London and the discrimination he faced in relation to Steve McQueen's series Small Axe. Discussing mistreatment at the hands of police he remarked that:

Seeing the crowd at Acme, the then-promoter Andy Czezowski started up The Roxy, a London nightclub during the original outbreak of punk in England, so that people could go from the store and have some place to party. As most bands of that era had yet to be recorded, there were limited punk rock records to be played. Instead, Letts included many dub and reggae records in his sets, and is credited with introducing those sounds to the London punk scene, which was to influence the Clash and other bands. As a tribute, he is pictured on the cover of the EP Black Market Clash (1980) and the compilation album Super Black Market Clash (1993). He was able to use the fame and money from DJing and the Acme story to make his first film, The Punk Rock Movie (1978).

Letts quit the retail business to manage the band the Slits. He was able to get the Slits to open for the Clash during the White Riot tour. While on the White Riot tour he decided that management was not for him, but continued to shoot material for The Punk Rock Movie (1978).

Letts went to Jamaica for the first time when, after the Sex Pistols broke up, Johnny Rotten decided to escape the media frenzy by going with entrepreneur Richard Branson to Jamaica. It was on this trip that Branson was inspired to start up Virgin's Frontline reggae record label.

A portrait of Letts by photographer Dean Chalkley featured in the exhibition Return of the Rudeboy at Somerset House in the middle of 2014.

In recognition of Letts' unique contribution to music, on 16 October 2013 he was presented with a BASCA Gold Badge of Merit.

Personal life
Letts is married to Grace and the couple have two children. He also has a son and a daughter from a previous relationship. 

In September 2020 Letts and his wife Grace were featured on BBC's  Gardeners' World, showing how they had combined their different tastes for plants and culture in their town garden in north west London.

In 2022 Letts received an honorary doctorate from Nottingham University.

Creative projects

Music
In 1978, Letts recorded an EP, Steel Leg v the Electric Dread, with Keith Levene, Jah Wobble and Steel Leg. After Mick Jones was fired from the Clash, he and Letts founded Big Audio Dynamite in 1984. In 1990 Letts formed Screaming Target. As of 1 April 2009, Letts is presenting a weekly show on BBC Radio 6 Music.

Books
In 2006, he published his autobiography, Culture Clash: Dread Meets Punk Rockers.

Films
Since his first movie, The Punk Rock Movie (1978), Letts has expanded to doing documentaries and music videos for multiple bands. In 1997, he travelled to Jamaica to direct Dancehall Queen. His film Westway to the World (2000) won a Grammy Award in 2003.

Filmography (as director)

Music videos

Quotes
"A good idea attempted is better than a bad idea perfected." –Don Letts to The Guardian

References

External links
 
 
 
 Don Letts' Culture Clash Radio (BBC Radio 6 Music)
 Don Letts Homepage
 Gregory Mario Whitfield interview  
 ‘There And Black Again’ book review [Greek] 

1956 births
Living people
People from Brixton
Big Audio Dynamite members
English people of Jamaican descent
The Clash
English DJs
Black British DJs
Grammy Award winners
People educated at Archbishop Tenison's Church of England School, Lambeth
Black British rock musicians
English music video directors
BBC Radio 6 Music presenters
Film directors from London
Musicians from London
Basement 5 members